Jahshaun Mustaf Anglin (born 6 May 2001) is a Jamaican footballer.

Career

Club
Anglin plays for Harbour View F.C. in Jamaica.

On 29 January 2021, Anglin made a jump to the United States and signed with Miami FC of the second division USL Championship.

International
Anglin was called up to the Jamaica senior team for a friendly against Bermuda on 10 March 2020. He made his international debut the next day, coming on as a substitute for Peter-Lee Vassell in the 58th minute as Jamaica won the match 2-0.

Personal life
On 28 September 2021 Anglin was arrested for allegedly sexually assaulting a woman on the campus of Florida International University, where Miami FC play home matches, in University Park, Florida. He was latter charged with one count of sexual battery.

References

External links
 

Living people
2001 births
Jamaican footballers
Jamaica international footballers
Association football forwards
USL Championship players
Harbour View F.C. players
Miami FC players
Sportspeople from Kingston, Jamaica
Jamaican expatriate footballers
Jamaican expatriate sportspeople in the United States
Expatriate soccer players in the United States